Vanessa Estelle Williams (sometimes professionally credited as Vanessa A. Williams) (born May 12, 1963) is an American actress and producer. She is best known for her roles as Maxine Joseph–Chadway in the Showtime drama series, Soul Food (2000–04), for which she received NAACP Image Award for Outstanding Actress in a Drama Series and as Nino Brown's feisty gun moll, Keisha in the 1991 crime drama film, New Jack City. Williams is also known for her role as Anne-Marie McCoy in the first and fourth of the Candyman films, and as Rhonda Blair in the first season of the Fox prime time soap opera, Melrose Place (1992–93).

Early life and education 
Williams was born and raised in Brooklyn, New York. Williams has three brothers. Her mother Verdell died when she was 10 years old leaving Williams to be raised by her grandmother, Johnnie Mae Mungen. She has traced her ancestry back to Georgia and Virginia. After high school she went on to get a bachelor's degree in theater and business management from Marymount Manhattan College.

Career
Williams later went to acting in films and television, becoming known simply as "Vanessa Williams". In the area of acting, she ran into name conflict with singer/actress and former Miss America Vanessa Williams (also born 1963). Screen Actors Guild rules prohibited duplicate stage naming. Vanessa Estelle had registered the name "Vanessa Williams" first, so as a compromise, the former Miss America was occasionally credited as "Vanessa L. Williams" in acting credits. To compound the confusion, both actresses starred in versions of the drama Soul Food (Vanessa L. Williams in the film version, and Vanessa E. Williams in its TV series adaptation). The Screen Actors Guild eventually took the issue to arbitration and decided both actresses could use the professional name "Vanessa Williams".

Television 
Williams began her acting career in 1989, appearing in episodes of The Cosby Show and Law & Order. In 1992, she was cast as Rhonda Blair, the first and only black regular character, in the Fox prime time soap opera, Melrose Place. She was written off after only one season for lack of direction. "I think they didn't make the effort to equip themselves [to write for a black character], either by hiring a black writer or asking me things," said Williams later. She later had guest starring roles on NYPD Blue and Living Single, before she was cast as a series regular in the ABC legal drama, Murder One (1995–1996) created by Steven Bochco. She received her first nomination for an NAACP Image Award for Outstanding Supporting Actress in a Drama Series for her performance on the show. In 1996, Williams had a recurring role as Dr. Grace Carr in the CBS medical drama series, Chicago Hope, for which she received an NAACP Image Award for Outstanding Actress in a Drama Series nomination.

In 2000, Williams was cast as Maxine Chadway in the Showtime drama series Soul Food, a continuation of the successful 1997 film of the same name. Two other leads were played by Nicole Ari Parker and Malinda Williams. In the 1997 film, Vanessa L. Williams played the leading role of Teri Joseph, and Vivica A. Fox played Maxine. For her performance, Williams won an NAACP Image Award for Outstanding Actress in a Drama Series in 2003, and received three additional nominations. The series aired to 2004 and went on to be the longest running drama with a predominantly black cast in the history of American prime-time television.

After Soul Food, Williams had guest starring roles on Cold Case, Knight Rider and Lincoln Heights. In 2015, she was cast in a recurring role of Iris West's mother in The CW drama series, The Flash. In October 2016, it was announced she was cast in the role of Valerie Grant on the NBC soap opera, Days of Our Lives.

Film 
In film, Williams is best known for playing Keisha in the 1991 crime thriller New Jack City opposite Wesley Snipes and Ice T. She is also known for playing Anne-Marie McCoy in the 1992 horror film Candyman opposite Tony Todd and Virginia Madsen. The following years she had small parts in Drop Squad (1994), Mother (1996), Punks (2000), Like Mike (2002), and Imagine That (2009) alongside Soul Food co-star Nicole Ari Parker. Williams has also starred in a number of made for television movies, including Emmy Award-nominated performance in Our America (2002). She also had roles in several smaller productions in recent years. In 2021, she returned to her role of Anne-Marie McCoy in the fourth film in the Candyman film series.

Personal life
Williams married Andre Wiseman in November 1992 when the couple eloped. The couple have two sons together: Omar Tafari (March 5, 1997) and Haile Zion Ali (born 2003). In April 2018, Williams filed for divorce from Wiseman for the second time.

Filmography

Film

Television

Awards and nominations

References

External links 

Actresses from New York City
American film actresses
Living people
People from Bedford–Stuyvesant, Brooklyn
African-American actresses
American television actresses
20th-century American actresses
21st-century American actresses
20th-century African-American women
21st-century African-American women
21st-century African-American people
1963 births
Tikar people